The Chinese Foundation Secondary School (CFSS), is a co-educational secondary school located in Siu Sai Wan, Hong Kong. It is a Direct Subsidy Scheme school.

Background 
The school was founded in 2000 by Maxim's heiress and CPPCC member Annie Wu, through her Chinese History and Culture Educational Foundation.

The premises occupy a total area of approximately 7,460 square metres.

Controversy
In 2019, school founder Annie Wu controversially put pressure on the school to punish staff and students who supported the ongoing pro-democracy protests. Alumni gathered outside the entrance on September 4, 2019 to express their disappointment and anger towards the school's unsupportive attitude.

Green policies

Background
A Sustainable Development Team promotes sustainable development on campus, such as supporting energy-saving and environmental protection practices: temperature, lighting, green office procurement and operation principles, waste management and green laboratories.

Awards
CFSS has joined the Sustainable Development School Award Programme, and won "Gold Award School" two sessions in a row in 2009-2010 and 2010-2012 from the Council for Sustainable Development Hong Kong. It has also achieved the award of the status of Education for Sustainable Development (ESD) Experimental Schools in China presented by UNESCO China in September 2012.

International prizes

Annual summer music event
Since 2003, CFSS has organized various cultural programs. There are varied activities, ranging from Chinese calligraphy to Western painting; from folk dance to opera.

A number of professionals and maestros were invited to broaden students' horizons in special topics: Percussion maestro Lung Heung Wing, shadow play master Wong Fai and explorer Rebecca Lee Lok Szeetc.

See also
Education in Hong Kong

References

External links
School website

Secondary schools in Hong Kong
Direct Subsidy Scheme schools
Siu Sai Wan
Educational institutions established in 2000
2000 establishments in Hong Kong